Nicholas Balfour Spooner (born 28 August 1991) is a South African field hockey player. He competed in the 2020 Summer Olympics.

References

External links

1991 births
Living people
Field hockey players from Hamburg
2018 Men's Hockey World Cup players
Field hockey players at the 2020 Summer Olympics
South African male field hockey players
Olympic field hockey players of South Africa
South African expatriate sportspeople in Germany
Expatriate field hockey players
Male field hockey midfielders
Harvestehuder THC players
Men's Feldhockey Bundesliga players
21st-century South African people
2023 Men's FIH Hockey World Cup players